Osku Simana Heinonen (born 4 September 1992) is a Finnish basketball player for Tampereen Pyrintö of the Korisliiga, where he has won 2014 Finnish championship. Alongside Finnish competitions, Heinonen represented Pyrintö in EuroChallenge and Baltic Basketball League. He has also represented Pyrintö's reserve team and Kouvot.

Heinonen has also played in Finland's national youth teams. He injured his knee in February 2014 and therefore missed the end of the season.

Pyrintö achieved national silver medals in 2016 losing to Kouvot at the finals. In June 2016 Heinonen signed a one-year contract with Kouvot. In June 2017 he returned to Pyrintö.

Trophies and awards
Finnish Championship 2014
 Runner-up 2016
Finnish Cup runner-up 2012
 Fourth place in Baltic League 2014

References

External links
Osku Heinonen Finnish Basketball Association
Osku Heinonen Eurobasket.com

1992 births
Living people
BC Nokia players
Finnish men's basketball players
Kouvot players
Sportspeople from Tampere
Tampereen Pyrintö players
Forwards (basketball)